Emigrant Gap (formerly, Wilsons Ranch) is an unincorporated community in Placer County, California. It lies at an elevation of 5190 feet (1582 m).

The Wilsons Ranch post office opened in 1865, changed its name to Emigrant Gap in 1868. The name Wilsons Ranch honored a stage stop operator.

Climate
According to the Köppen Climate Classification system, Emigrant Gap has a warm-summer Mediterranean climate, abbreviated "Csb" on climate maps.

References

Unincorporated communities in Placer County, California
Populated places in the Sierra Nevada (United States)
Unincorporated communities in California